Acirsa morsei is a species of sea snail, a marine gastropod mollusk in the family Epitoniidae.

References

Epitoniidae
Gastropods described in 1926